Rebekka Elisabeth Ziska Dahl (born 20 August 1996) is a Danish martial artist who represents her native country Denmark in sport jujitsu (JJIF).

Career 
She began with sport jujitsu at age of 9 in hometown Hillerød. Her father is from Faroe Islands. She is member of danish sport jujitsu team since 2013. In 2017 she won gold medal at World Games in Wrocław, discipline Fighting System.

Results

References

1996 births
Living people
Danish martial artists
World Games gold medalists
World Games bronze medalists
Competitors at the 2017 World Games
Competitors at the 2022 World Games
Sportspeople from the Capital Region of Denmark
20th-century Danish people
21st-century Danish people